The ninth season of The Voice began airing on 24 May 2020. For the first time in the show's history all of the coaches returned: Delta Goodrem for her eighth, Kelly Rowland and Boy George for their fourth and Guy Sebastian for his second. Following the exit of Sonia Kruger, Darren McMullen, who hosted the first four seasons, returns with new co-host, Renee Bargh.

Chris Sebastian from Team Kelly won the competition on 19 July 2020, marking the second All-Star to win, as well as Kelly Rowland's second and final victory as a coach.

Coaches and hosts

Right after the end of the eighth season, the series was renewed for a ninth season and was announced that all coaches would return the new season. Darren McMullen, who exited as host following the conclusion of the fourth season, returns as host, alongside new co-host Renee Bargh, following the exit of Sonia Kruger.

In June 2020 the Sydney Morning Herald reported that Marcia Hines and The Veronicas were to fill in as guest mentors for Rowland and Boy George respectively, who will be mentoring their acts remotely from the US and UK because of travel restrictions in place due to the COVID-19 pandemic.

Teams
Colour key

	

 Due to COVID-19 and international travel restrictions, Caleb Jago-Ward and Ella Monnery could not travel from New Zealand to perform in the Playoffs. Elyse Sene-Lefao and Jimi the Kween were chosen to replace them, respectively.

Blind auditions
In the Blind Auditions, each coach had to complete their teams with 12 contestants. New this season, each coach had two Blocks to prevent another of the coaches from getting a contestant.

Episode 1 (24 May)

Episode 2 (25 May)

Episode 3 (26 May)

Episode 4 (31 May)

Episode 5 (1 June)

Episode 6 (2 June)

Episode 7 (7 June)

Episode 8 (8 June)

Episode 9 (14 June)

Episode 10 (15 June) 

Guy turned his chair for Wolf Winters despite already having a full team. Producers allowed him to keep Wolf as the 13th member of his team with the condition of losing two artists in a three-way battle in the next round.

Battle rounds
The Battle rounds started on 21 June. The coaches can save two losing artists from any team, including their own. Contestants who win their battle or are saved will advance to the playoffs.

 Delta could not decide on a winner between Janie and Matt. With approval from the producers, she suggested they become a duo, and both artists agreed. The duo adopted the stage name "Goldi".

Playoffs
The Playoffs started on 5 July. In the Playoffs, each coach pairs two of their artists together, with each artist singing an individual song following a theme. After all of their team's playoffs were done, the coaches chose one of their losing artists as a wildcard. The top 20 contestants who win their Playoff or are chosen as a Wildcard move on to the Showdowns. Due to COVID-19 and travel restrictions, Kelly and George mentored their artists remotely, with Marcia Hines and The Veronicas filling in as guest mentors respectively. Artists Caleb Jago-Ward from Team George and Ella Monnery from Team Kelly were unable to continue on the competition also due to travel restrictions, being stuck in New Zealand. Coaches George and Kelly were allowed to bring back an eliminated Battle loser to fill in for Caleb and Ella, George choosing Elyse Sene-Lefao and Kelly chose Jimi the Kween.

Episode 15 (5 July)

Episode 16 (6 July)

Kelly opted to take neither Elishia nor Jimi to the Showdowns, with approval from the producers. To even out her team, Kelly was granted an extra wildcard pick.

Episode 17 (7 July)

Guest mentors The Veronicas performed their latest single "Biting My Tongue".

Grand finale week

Showdowns
The Showdowns were first broadcast on 12 and 13 July 2020. Over the two episodes, all artists of the Top 20 take on a solo performance of a song of their choice. Teams Kelly and Guy performing on the first night, with Teams Delta and George performing on the second night. At the end of each episode, the coaches choose two out of their five artists to advance to the Semifinals.

Semi-finals
The Semi-finals episode was first broadcast on 14 July 2020. At the end of the episode, the coaches were allowed to take one artist each through to the Grand Finale due to the COVID-19 pandemic. This also marks Guy Sebastian's first season with an artist in the Grand Finale.

Grand Finale
The Grand Finale was first broadcast on 19 July 2020. Each artist performed a solo song and a duet with their coach, or a guest singer. This was the only episode of the season where the results were determined by public vote and not by the coaches. 

Due to COVID-19 travel restrictions, Boy George and Kelly could not perform with their artists, so Boy George had The Veronicas sing with Siala, while Kelly had Daryl Braithwaite sing with Chris.

Grand finale week results

Colour key

Artist's info

Result details

Overall

Team

Contestants who appeared on previous season or TV shows
Roxane LeBrasse was on the third season of Australian Idol and placed in ninth.
 Virginia Lillye auditioned for season 1 of the show, with no chairs turned.
Jon Wiza was a finalist on The Voice Colombia (La Voz Colombia)
Chris Sebastian competed on season 1 of the show and was eliminated in the quarter-finals.
Jesse Teinaki competed on the show's previous season where he was mentored by Guy then Delta, and was eliminated in the battle rounds. Also, he auditioned for the sixth season of The X Factor in 2014, but didn't make the Live Shows. 
Sebastian Coe competed for The Voice Kids and was eliminated in the battle rounds.
Matt Gresham competed in season 4 of The X Factor and made it to the top 24. He also returned in season 5 of The X Factor but withdrew after making the top 24.
Masha Mnjoyan was the winner of the first season of The Voice of Armenia
Caleb Jago-Ward competed on season 4 of the show where he was mentored by Delta, and was eliminated in the semi-finals.
Elishia Semaan auditioned for season 6 and season 8 of The X Factor part of BEATZ, and didn't make it into the lives shows of the sixth season. However, was eliminated in the eight season at the semi-finals.
Natalie Gauci was the winner of the fifth season of Australian Idol.
Lyric McFarland competed on season 2 of the show, and was eliminated in the showdown rounds.
Johnny Manuel competed on season 12 of America's Got Talent and was eliminated in the semi-finals. He also was in the Eurovision Song Contest 2018 in the band Equinox
Mark Furze played Ric Dalby on Home and Away
Elyse Sene-Lefao auditioned for season 8 of the show, with no chairs turned, and the audition wasn't aired.
Steve Clisby competed on season 2 of the show where he was mentored by Seal then Delta, and was eliminated in the semi-finals.
Kat Jade competed on season 3 of the show where she was mentored by Kylie Minogue, and made it to the top 8.

Ratings
Colour key:
  – Highest rating during the season
  – Lowest rating during the season

References

9
2020 Australian television seasons